Daniel Carr or Dan Carr could refer to: 

Daniel Carr (journeyman) (boxer)  (born 1987), United Kingdom (British)
Daniel Carr (footballer) (born 1994), Trinidad and Tobago footballer  
Daniel Carr (ice hockey) (born 1991), Canadian hockey forward
Dan Carr (poet) (1951–2012), American typographer and poet